The 1984 Tour de France was the 71st edition of Tour de France, one of cycling's Grand Tours. The Tour began in Montreuil with a prologue individual time trial on 29 June and Stage 12 occurred on 10 July with a flat stage from Saint-Girons. The race finished on the Champs-Élysées in Paris on 22 July.

Stage 12
10 July 1984 — Saint-Girons to Blagnac,

Stage 13
11 July 1984 — Blagnac to Rodez,

Stage 14
12 July 1984 — Rodez to Domaine du Rouret,

Stage 15
13 July 1984 — Domaine du Rouret to Grenoble,

Stage 16
15 July 1984 — Les Échelles to La Ruchère,  (individual time trial)

Stage 17
16 July 1984 — Grenoble to Alpe d'Huez,

Stage 18
17 July 1984 — Le Bourg-d'Oisans to La Plagne,

Stage 19
18 July 1984 — La Plagne to Morzine,

Stage 20
19 July 1984 — Morzine to Crans-Montana (Switzerland),

Stage 21
20 July 1984 — Crans-Montana (Switzerland) to Villefranche-sur-Saône,

Stage 22
21 July 1984 — Villié-Morgon to Villefranche-sur-Saône,  (individual time trial)

Stage 23
22 July 1984 — Pantin to Paris Champs-Élysées,

References

1984 Tour de France
Tour de France stages